Futch is a surname. Notable people with the surname include:

Bing Futch (born 1966), American musician
Eddie Futch (1911–2001), American boxing trainer
Theodore Leslie Futch (1895–1992), American Army officer
Truman Futch (1891–1960), American politician and judge